Bhutia are a community of Tibetan people. Bhutia may also refer to
Bhutia (surname)
Bhutia Horse, a breed of small mountain horse from Sikkim, India
Bhutia Busty, a town in West Bengal
Bhutia Busty Monastery in Bhutia Busty 
Bhaichung Bhutia Football Schools, a football youth development initiative 
Nepali Bhutia Lepcha, a political party in Sikkim, India